Blake and Mortimer is a Belgian comics series created by the writer and comics artist Edgar P. Jacobs. It was one of the first series to appear in the Franco-Belgian comics magazine Tintin in 1946, and was subsequently published in book form by Le Lombard.

The main protagonists of the adventures are Philip Mortimer, a leading British scientist, and his friend Captain Francis Blake of MI5. The main antagonist is their sworn enemy, Colonel Olrik, who has appeared in almost every book. Their confrontations take them into the realms of detective investigation and science-fiction, dealing with such themes as time travel, Atlantis and espionage.

Since the death of Jacobs, new books have been published by two separate teams of artists and writers. A television series based upon the series was produced in 1997, entitled Blake and Mortimer.

The books by Jacobs himself are generally set in the very period of their writing, but those authored by others after his death are set mostly in the 1950s and 1960s.

Main characters
The three main characters of the series were already present in slightly different form in the unrelated, first full-length comic strip by Jacobs, Le Rayon U (The U-Ray, 1943). In the original Jacobs' version it is not specified that Blake and Mortimer are Welsh and Scottish. They are simply two proud Britons serving HM's Government. The post-Jacobs title The Sarcophagi of the Sixth Continent dwells on their early lives, showing how they met in colonial India:
Professor Philip Angus Mortimer – a leading physicist of Scottish descent, he grew up in the British Raj and is the archetypical British gentleman scholar. Mortimer was based upon a friend and sometime collaborator of Jacobs, Jacques Van Melkebeke. There was one imaginative addition by Jacobs, since Van Melkebeke had no beard.
Captain Francis Percy Blake – Welsh-born officer in His Majesty's armed forces. He studied at Oxford and later became head of the British Security Service MI5 but is still very active in the field. He is a master of disguise, even fooling Mortimer on occasion. Blake was modeled on another friend and sometimes collaborator of Jacobs, Jacques Laudy, with added mustache.

Colonel Olrik – the perennial villain from the first installment onwards. Of the original series there was only one book that did not feature him in one capacity or other: Le Piège Diabolique (The Time Trap). Olrik started out in The Secret of the Swordfish as the head of intelligence for Oriental dictator Basam Damdu. His activities have since ranged from mercenary, spy, smuggler and general criminal adventurer. He's characterized as someone from the West, but his real name, birthplace and exact nationality are unknown. In one of the recent series (not written by original author Jacobs) Olrik is made to appear as if he is some sort of a specialist in Slavic languages, and that he once fled Hungary, suggesting he's from there. Olrik's appearance is a self-portrait of Jacobs.
Lieutenant Ahmed Nasir – Nasir Ahmed is the faithful friend and ally of the two main heroes Francis Blake and Philip Mortimer. He appears for the first time in volume one of The Secret of the Swordfish, where he prevents the two men being captured by Olrik in Iran. He is a sergeant of the 5th Battalion of the "Makran Levy Corps" who served under Blake. Following this intervention, Nasir during this adventure helps the two heroes in Egypt, then in London, becoming the butler of Professor Philip Mortimer. Nasir will in fact appear only in the first albums of Jacobs: The Secret of the Swordfish, The Mystery of the Great Pyramid, and The Yellow Mark. His disappearance (which in time corresponds to that of the British Empire) remains unexplained in the later albums by Jacobs. He reappears many years later in The Sarcophagi of the Sixth Continent, by Yves Sente and André Juillard. It is learned that after leaving the service and Mortimer, he returned to India, where he went into the intelligence service.
Commissioner Pradier is a character created by E.P. Jacobs, whose physique was greatly inspired by the actor Jean Gabin. Divisional Commissioner to the Paris Branch of Territorial Surveillance (DST), Pradier helps Blake and Mortimer during their adventures taking place during their stay in France.
Nastasia Wardynska is a female friend and ally of Blake and Mortimer. She is from Russia. She hasn't appeared in any of Jacobs books, but features several times in subsequent works by other authors.
Sarah Summertown is a novelist-archaeologist, a friend of Blake and Mortimer. It is strongly implied that she and Mortimer were romantically involved during Mortimer's youth.
Elizabeth McKenzie is a student in Cambridge, daughter of Sarah Summertown (and, it is slightly implied, Mortimer).
Admiral Sir William Gray is the prime minister of the United Kingdom and first sea lord and chairman of the chiefs of staffs committee. 
Jeronimo Ramirez is a Mexican-American who works for the Los Alamos Nuclear Centre.
Jessie Wingo is a half-Cheyenne FBI agent.
Sharkey is an American henchman of Olrik.
Razul is a Bizenjo (known as Bezendjas) henchman of Olrik.
Jack is the glasses-wearing henchman of Olrik.
Freddy is Sharkey's partner-in-crime.
David Honeychurch is deputy chief of MI5 under work for Blake.
Glenn Kendall is a Scotland Yard officer.
Professor Labrousse is an ally of Blake and Mortimer and meteorologist from Paris, France.
Commander William Steele is chief of MI6.
Basam Damdu is Olrik's commander-in-chief and the absolute dictator of the Yellow Empire. A megalomaniac based on Adolf Hitler and Joseph Stalin, he is obsessed with ruling the world and is willing to destroy it rather than lose control of it.
Mrs. Benson is Blake and Mortimer's landlady, a widow of Blake's former CO.
Professor Akira Sato is a Japanese scientist, a cybernetician working at the Japanese Institute of Space and Astronautical Science
Kim is a Korean scientist, who is an assistant of Pr Akira Sato

Story characteristics
Although the series is called Blake and Mortimer, it is Professor Mortimer who is often the main protagonist. In the original series, it is mainly he who, through his impulsive character, gets entangled in adventurous circumstances. Blake is the straight man, the serious army officer who comes to the rescue. On the bad-guy side, Colonel Olrik combines characteristics of both heroes.

Blake and Mortimer adventures are characterized by a quest, most often involving adventures underground until the final ending, free and back to the surface. The story structures include some similarities: when the adventure begins certain important but unseen events have already taken place; at the beginning of The Yellow Mark, for instance, the titular character has already made himself known through various activities which the reader only learns about when Mortimer reads a newspaper about these events. Some of the adventures also end with the characters reflecting on what they have learned from their experiences: after his travels through time in Time Trap, Mortimer concludes that rather than dwell on the "good old days" or look forward to a "brighter future", one should be content with the present.

Blake and Mortimer are sometimes shown to live in the same house, sharing an apartment in the same manner as Sherlock Holmes and Doctor Watson. Many francophone comics have had similar themes of confirmed bachelors living together, including Tintin and Captain Haddock, Asterix & Obelix, Spirou & Fantasio, and Tif & Tondu. These series were all first published during a time when censorship of youth publications was very stringent, and segregation between girls and boys was applied with rigor.

Jacobs always drew his stories as being contemporary and based on real environments, so the first few titles have a 1950s look and feel while the last installments are decidedly 1970s. One exception to this rule is, again, Time Trap, which starts in the present (i.e. early 1960s) but whose action, due to a sabotaged malfunctioning time machine, largely takes place in the 51st century, and includes a short ventures in medieval times and a stopover in the Jurassic period. Post-Jacobs stories are so far integrated in the chronology of the first ones or precede it, therefore taking place in the 1940s, 1950s and 1960s.

The art style of E.P. Jacobs, although typical of the Belgian comics drawings (called "clear line" or "ligne claire"), is specific in its extensive use of light colors and shots very similar to what can be found in film production (the panoramic view over London by night opening The Yellow Mark being a good example).

The writing, on the other hand, is noted for its high verbosity (in The Yellow "M", a page has over 900 words), with captions and word balloons frequently stating the action that's also depicted visually.

Publication history

Jacobs
When Tintin magazine was launched on 26 September 1946, it included the story, Le secret de l'Espadon (The Secret of the Swordfish) which introduced the characters of Captain Francis Blake of the British Intelligence Service, his friend professor Philip Mortimer, a leading physicist, and their sworn enemy Colonel Olrik.

The epic of the Swordfish ended in 1949 but Olrik, Blake and Mortimer continued their conflict through a whole series of science-fiction/detective stories that saw them go all the way from the lost continent of Atlantis to the catacombs of Paris.

After Jacobs' death in 1987, Bob de Moor completed his unfinished last story.

Post-Jacobs
From 1987, the Jacobs estate, centered on the still-operating Jacobs Studios, republished all of Jacobs' works.

In the 1990s, after much debate about story authenticity, Dargaud got permission to revive the Blake and Mortimer series, with new stories by a new team of author/draughtsman. The series was still firmly set in the 1950s and included many new regular supporting characters, most notably Blake's colleagues in the security services. Much of series has been created by two separate teams, Van Hamme/Benoit and Sente/Juillard.

The first book, The Francis Blake Affair, was published in 1996. Famous scenarist Jean Van Hamme provided the storylines while Ligne claire specialist draughtsman Ted Benoit (whose style resembles the later Jacobs's) was contracted for the artwork. Purists immediately objected to the choice of Van Hamme and, upon publication, went on to discover some typical Van Hamme plot twists they disliked. Jacobs' science-fiction was noticeably absent with the story focusing on espionage. However the book became a relative success and the publisher decided to continue the line. In the meantime, both Benoit and Van Hamme were tied up on other projects and work on the next book started to lag.

As an interim solution, writer Yves Sente and artist André Juillard were contracted to publish another adventure, The Voronov Plot (1998) which took its theme from the Cold War.

Finally, Van Hamme and Benoit managed to finish their album and The Strange Encounter appeared in 2001, with Blake and Mortimer confronting mysterious alien creatures.

This was followed by Sente and Juillard's two-book adventure: The Sarcophagi of the Sixth Continent (volume 1,The Universal Threat in 2003; volume 2, Battle of the Minds in 2004) which also dealt with Blake and Mortimer's youth and how they first met in pre-independence India.

In 2008 Sente and Juillard released another book entitled The Gondwana Shrine which chronologically follows the events of The Sarcophagi of the Sixth Continent.

The next adventure in the series, The Curse of the Thirty Denarii, is divided in two volumes and is written by Jean Van Hamme. The first volume, titled Le Manuscript de Nicodemus (The Manuscript of Nicodemus), was drawn by René Sterne, who suddenly died on 15 November 2006, delaying the publication of the book. Sterne's girlfriend Chantal De Spiegeleer eventually completed his work, which was published on 20 November 2009. Aubin Frechon drew the second volume of the adventure, which was published 26 November 2010.

List of titles

Additionally, the storyboard sketches by Jacobs of Volume 12, left incomplete at the time of his death, have been re-issued in 1996 outside of the series as Dossier Mortimer contre Mortimer.

 The Secret of the Swordfish originally consisted of two parts. In 1984 it was republished in three parts.

Translations

English
Like many Franco-Belgian comics, Blake and Mortimer initially had limited publication in English.

Blake and Mortimer Editions

Les Editions Blake and Mortimer aka The Blake and Mortimer Editions published English translations of all three parts of The Secret of the Swordfish in 1986, both parts of The Mystery of the Great Pyramid in 1987 and The Yellow "M" in 1988.

Comcat
Catalan Communications, under its 'Comcat' line of books, published two books in inexpensive trade paperback copies in the US. They released:
The Time Trap (Le Piège diabolique) (1989) 
Atlantis Mystery (L'Énigme de l'Atlantide) (1990) 

There were also plans to release Secret of the Great Pyramid in 2 volumes and then The Yellow Mark. However, Catalan went under before they could get a chance to realize them.

Cinebook Ltd

Cinebook Ltd has been publishing English language translations of Blake and Mortimer since 2007. The following volumes have been released to date:
The Yellow 'M''' (published January 2007)  The Mystery of the Great Pyramid Part 1: The Papyrus of Manethon (published November 2007)  The Mystery of the Great Pyramid Part 2: The Chamber of Horus (published January 2008)  The Francis Blake Affair (published September 2008)  The Strange Encounter (published January 2009)  S.O.S. Meteors (published September 2009)  The Affair of the Necklace (published January 2010)  The Voronov Plot (published October 2010)  The Sarcophagi of the Sixth Continent, part 1 (published January 2011) The Sarcophagi of the Sixth Continent, part 2 (published April 2011) The Gondwana Shrine (published September 2011) Atlantis Mystery (published January 2012) The Curse of the 30 Pieces of Silver, part 1 (published April 2012) The Curse of the 30 Pieces of Silver, part 2 (published August 2012) The Secret of the Swordfish, part 1 (published February 2013) The Secret of the Swordfish, part 2 (published June 2013) The Secret of the Swordfish, part 3 (published October 2013) The Oath of the Five Lords (published March 2014) The Time Trap (published September 2014) The Septimus Wave (published February 2015) Plutarch's Staff (published September 2015) Professor Sato's Three Formulas, Volume 1: Mortimer in Tokyo (published February 2016) Professor Sató's Three Formulae, Volume 2: Mortimer vs. Mortimer (published May 2016) The Testament of William S. (published April 2017) The Valley of Immortals, part 1: Threat Over Hong Kong (published April 2019) The Valley of Immortals, part 2: The Thousand Arms of the Mekong (published March 2020) The Call of the Moloch (published March 2021) The Last Swordfish (published May 2022) Eight Hours in Berlin (published Dec 2022) 
Further volumes are scheduled as followsThe Last Pharaoh (TBC)Cornish Adventures (TBC)

Adaptations

Radio series
The album The Time Trap was adapted into a radio play in 1962.

Television series

In 1997, the company Ellipse made an animated series containing 26 episodes, which made up 13 stories, 4 of which were entirely new and not based on existing books.

Film adaptations
Several attempts have been made to adapt The Yellow M to film, although none has been successful. Spanish director Álex de la Iglesia stated that he was working on an adaptation of the comic to be released around 2010; this project never came to fruition. At one point, it was rumored that Hugh Laurie and Kiefer Sutherland were to play Blake and Mortimer respectively. Since then, however, nothing has come of this project.

Games
In 2014, French publisher Ystari Games released the deduction and social table top board game Blake & Mortimer: Witness.

In 2011, French publishers Dargaud and Anuman Interactive launched the first video game adapted from the Blake and Mortimer series. Blake and Mortimer: The Curse of the Thirty Denarii is a hidden objects game featuring 3D and comic-strip environments.

In popular culture

In 2005, as part of the Brussels' Comic Book Route, a wall was designed in the Rue du Houblon/Hopstraat in Brussels which depicts the cover of The Yellow "M". The wall was designed by G. Oreopoulos and D. Vandegeerde.

ParodiesBlake and Mortimer have made cameo appearances in various comic series, particularly those series that are set in the same period of history, the twilight of the British Empire. The cameos are often a tribute to their creator, Edgar P. Jacobs.

For example, they make a one-off appearance in the Valérian adventure On the False Earths when the hero visits a Victorian London club.

Another example is the popular Belgian comic series concerning the adventures of MI5 agent Colonel Clifton. Clifton once featured in a story entitled Jade, published in 2003. In it he meets two characters called Blake and Mortimer, though even as caricatures they bear little resemblance (perhaps deliberately) to Jacob's originals. The story includes elements from the original books, such as the entrance to the secret passage from S.O.S. Météores and the cave that doubles as a submarine base in L'Affaire Francis Blake.

In 2005 Dargaud published a parody entitled Menaces sur l'Empire ("The Empire Under Threat"). This was a humorous presentation of the adventures of Blake and Mortimer and was not part of the canon (in fact, the space reserved for the series' title reads "Les Aventures de Philip et Francis" as opposed to "Les Aventures de Blake et Mortimer"). Jokes included:
Mortimer's attempts to break his diet, which his Indian manservant always thwarts, even from a long distance;
confusion over whether they are working for MI5 or MI6;
the heroes catching Prime Minister Winston Churchill in bed with a young woman who is not his wife;
a send-up of Bruce Lee's Game of Death.Tigresse Blanche (White Tigress) by Yann and Conrad is another Belgian comic series featuring the adventures of a Chinese Communist woman spy in post-World War II China. It features a British agent, Sir Francis Flake, whose friend (based on Mortimer) gets drunk on the announcement of Indian independence.

See also
[[Le Monde's 100 Books of the Century|Le Monde's 100 Books of the Century]]
The Adventures of Tintin

References

Sources

Guyard, Jean-Marc. Le baryton du neuvième art. Brussels: Éditions Blake et Mortimer, 1996. 
Jacobs, Edgar P. Un opéra de papier: Les mémoires de Blake et Mortimer. Paris: Gallimard, 1981. 
Lenne, Gérard. L'affaire Jacobs. Paris:  Megawave, 1990. 
Mouchart, Benoit.  A l'ombre de la ligne claire: Jacques Van Melkebeke, le clandestin de la B.D.'' Paris:  Vertige Graphic, 2002. 
Blake et Mortimer publications in Belgian Tintin  and French Tintin  BDoubliées

External links

  
 Blake and Mortimer 's Blog 
 Marque Jaune (Yellow Mark)  
 

 
Bandes dessinées
1946 comics debuts
Comics characters introduced in 1946
Belgian comics characters
Belgian comics titles
Belgian comic strips
Blake and Mortimer
Blake and Mortimer
Lombard Editions titles
Drama comics
Adventure comics
Detective comics
Spy comics
Comics adapted into radio series
Comics adapted into animated series
Comics adapted into television series
Comics adapted into video games
Comics by Edgar P. Jacobs
Comics set in the 1950s
Male characters in comics
Comics set in London